Merve Safa Kavakcı (born 19 August 1968) is a Turkish politician, who was elected as a Virtue Party (Turkish: Fazilet Partisi) deputy for Istanbul on 18 April 1999. She served as the Turkish ambassador to Malaysia from 2017 but was recalled to Ankara following the appointment of Emir Salim Yüksel as the Turkish Ambassador to Malaysia in June 2022.

Life and career
Kavakcı was born  in Ankara on 19 August 1968, to Imam Yusuf Ziya Kavakçı. She is of Georgian descent through her father. Like her father, Kavakcı is a hafiza, someone who has memorised the entire Quran. She received her master's degree from Harvard University and her PhD from Howard University. Kavakcı is currently a professor at George Washington University and Howard University in Washington D.C.

On 2 May 1999, members of the Democratic Left Party (Turkish: Demokratik Sol Parti, DSP) prevented Kavakcı from taking her oath of office at the swearing-in ceremony because they objected to her wearing a headscarf. She had not disclosed her American citizenship which was discovered after the elections, and she lost her seat in the parliament in March 2001. The Virtue Party was closed down by the Constitutional Court in June 2001.

In 2007, Kavakcı won a legal case when the European Court of Human Rights found that her expulsion from parliament was a violation of her human rights. Since then, she has been an outspoken critic of Turkey's secular political system, traveling the globe in support of Muslim women's rights, especially the right to wear the hijab. In addition to lecturing at universities throughout Europe and the United States, Kavakcı addressed the 2004 Parliament of the World's Religions in Barcelona. She also addressed the House of Lords in London, England, and has lectured and spoken at myriad American and European Universities including Harvard, Yale, Berlin, Hamburg, Hanover, Duisburg and Cambridge.

Kavakcı has been recognised as one of the World's 500 Most Influential Muslims. She was also recognised as a "Woman of Excellence" by the NAACP and GWU in 2004. She was awarded the Public Service Award in recognition of her efforts towards the advancement of human rights and Muslim Women's empowerment by the International Association for Women and Children in 2000. She was given a Service to Humanity Award by Haus Der Kulturellen Aktivität und Toleranz in Vienna, Austria, and was granted a Mother of the Year Award by Capital Platform of Ankara and the National Youth Organisation in 1999.

Kavakcı is a consultant for the U.S. Congress on the Muslim world and a columnist for the conservative Turkish daily newspaper Vakit. She also sits on the editorial board of the Mediterranean Quarterly. Additionally, she is the author of six books and numerous articles.

She has two children, Fatima Abushanab and Mariam Kavakcı.

In 2012, a book entitled The Day Turkey Stood Still: Merve Kavakci's Walk Into the Parliament by Richard Peres was published.

References

External links
 Official site 

1968 births
Living people
People from Ankara
Turkish people of Georgian descent
Turkish Sunni Muslims
Virtue Party politicians
Deputies of Istanbul
Turkish emigrants to the United States
American Sunni Muslims
Ambassadors of Turkey to Malaysia
University of Texas at Dallas alumni
Harvard University alumni
George Washington University faculty
Islam-related controversies
Howard University faculty
Hijab
21st-century Turkish women politicians
21st-century Turkish politicians